This is a list of listed buildings in Odsherred Municipality, Denmark.

The list

4500 Nykøbing Sj

4534 Hørve

4573 Højby

4581 Rørvig

References

External links

 Danish Agency of Culture
 Odsherred Arkitektur

 
Odsherred